Springhurst railway station is located on the North East line in Victoria, Australia. It serves the town of Springhurst, and opened on 29 November 1873 as Springs. It was renamed Springhurst in October 1890.

The station was also named Bontherambo and Naringa.

Springhurst handled heavy traffic from the Wahgunyah district, until the opening of the Wahgunyah branch line in 1879. A weatherboard station building was erected in 1878, next to a through-track goods shed that had been provided earlier. Track layout alterations were made in 1885, 1899, 1906 and 1919.

A signal cabin was provided in 1887, but was moved into the station building in 1899. Also in that year, the platform was extended to 110 metres. The present brick station building dates to 1950. The standard gauge line and road underpass were built in 1962.

In 1969, a siding leading to the former turntable was abolished. In September 1979, the former goods shed was demolished. In 1990, No. 5 road and siding "A" were abolished, as was the connection from No. 2 road to the Wahgunyah line.

The original platform (now Platform 2) was located on the broad gauge line. In 2011, that line was converted to standard gauge, and another platform (Platform 1) was built on the existing standard gauge line, which had opened in 1962.

In recent years, the station has had very low patronage. In 2016-2017, the station only recorded 1,566 passengers during that period, or around four passengers a day.

Demolished station Bowser was located between Springhurst and Wangaratta.

Platforms and services
Springhurst has two side platforms. It is served by V/Line Albury line trains.

Platform 1:
  services to Southern Cross

Platform 2:
  services to Albury

Transport links
V/Line runs a road coach service from Corowa to Wangaratta (via Rutherglen), which operates Monday – Friday.

Gallery

References

External links
Victorian Railway Stations gallery

Railway stations in Australia opened in 1873
Regional railway stations in Victoria (Australia)